Dortmund-Kurl station is in the Dortmund suburb of Kurl in the German state of North Rhine-Westphalia on the Dortmund–Hamm line. The station has two platform tracks and an overtaking track for long-distance trains and a freight track without platforms, which is no longer used.

History 
In 1847, Kurl station was opened by the Cologne-Minden Railway Company as a simple halt. Ticket sales were conducted at the nearby Zur Mühle restaurant. The Zeche Kurl (colliery) opened in 1855 had a siding at Kurl station.

On 1 April 1886 the first permanent station building was built on the south side of the railway line and still exists today as a residence. Even the former crossing keeper's house is inhabited.

In 1908, a new entrance building was erected on the north side of the tracks, which now only serves as a passageway to the tracks.

The station is listed as a monument by the city of Dortmund.

Services
It is served by the NRW-Express (RE 1) and the Rhein-Emscher-Express (RE 3).

References

External links

Railway stations in Dortmund
Railway stations in Germany opened in 1880